The Falconar F9A and F10A are a family of Canadian amateur-built aircraft, that were designed by Chris Falconar and produced by Falconar Avia. The F9A design was introduced in 1965 and both the F9A and F10A were supplied as kits or as plans for amateur construction by Falconar. The F9A and F10A are now available in the form of plans from Manna Aviation.

Design and development
The F9 is a variant of the Jodel D9. Falconar indicated that it incorporates a larger cockpit, simplified fittings, shoulder harnesses and aerodynamic improvements to improve stall characteristics.

Hans Teijgeler of Jodel.com says that the F9A varies from the D9 by using a new wing design, with new simplified spar and rib design and the dihedral point moved inboard, allowing the outer portion to fold for ground transport or storage, but at the cost of added weight. He describes the wing as "less efficient". Teijgeler says of the Falconar F9A, "the Falconar 'Jodel' should not be looked upon as a Jodel, but as a Falconar. This is [n]either good or bad. Just a fact to take into account"

The F9A and F10A are made from wood, with the flying surfaces covered in doped aircraft fabric. Construction time from the supplied kit is estimated as 700 hours.

Operational history
By November 2012, one F9A had been registered with Transport Canada, one F10A in the United States with the Federal Aviation Administration and none with the CAA in the United Kingdom.

Variants
F9
 Volkswagen air-cooled engine 
F9A
F10A
The fuselage is lengthened  from the F9A and stressed to 9g.

Specifications (F9A)

References

External links
F9A Official website
F10A Official website

Homebuilt aircraft
F9A
Single-engined tractor aircraft
Aircraft first flown in 1965